Achampalli (Mulbagal)  is a village in the southern state of Karnataka, India. It is located in the Mulbagal taluk of Kolar district in Karnataka.

See also
 Kolar
 Districts of Karnataka

References

External links
 Kolar District | kolar.nic.in

Villages in Kolar district